Aerial Acres is a fly-in unincorporated community in Kern County, California. It was noted as "a desert town at Clay Mine Road and Sequoia in Peerless Valley, California.

References

Unincorporated communities in Kern County, California
Unincorporated communities in California